Bibiana Manuela Fernández Chica (born 13 February 1954), better known as Bibiana Fernández and also known as Bibi Andersen, is a Spanish actress, singer, TV presenter and model.

Biography 
Fernández Chica was born in Tangier and spent her childhood in Málaga. She decided to receive hormone treatment in adulthood. She completed her gender confirmation surgery in 1991 and changed her name to Bibiana in 1994.

After spending some time performing in various shows around Barcelona, she went on to make her film debut in Vicente Aranda's Cambio de Sexo (Sex Change) in 1976.

With this movie she rose to stardom in Spain, appearing in several TV shows and releasing several hit songs such as "Call Me Lady Champagne" and "Sálvame".

In the 1980s she began working with film director Pedro Almodóvar and was cast in many of his movies. She also hosted different television shows while acting in more films.

She was married to Asdrúbal Ametller from 2000 to 2003.

In 2005, she started appearing as a panelist in the talk show Channel Nº4 on Cuatro with Boris Izaguirre and Ana García Siñeriz.

Discography 
 1980 – Bibi Andersen (album)
 1980 – "Call Me Lady Champagne" (single)
 1980 – "Sálvame" (single)
 1982 – "Canto" (single)

Filmography 
Cambio de Sexo (1977)
La noche más hermosa (1983) 
Matador (1986) 
La ley del deseo (1987)
Rowing with the Wind (1988)
Tacones lejanos (1992)
Acción mutante (1993)
Kika (1993)
Más que amor, frenesí (1996)

References

External links

 Bibi Photo Gallery Tribute
 Discography

1954 births
Living people
Spanish film actresses
Spanish vedettes
Spanish LGBT singers
Transgender actresses
Transgender female models
Transgender women musicians
People from Tangier
Chicas Almodóvar
20th-century Spanish actresses
21st-century LGBT people

Transgender singers